Myriam Vanlerberghe (born 1961) is a Belgian politician and a member of the Socialistische Partij Anders. She was elected as a member of the Belgian Senate in 2007.

Notes

Living people
Socialistische Partij Anders politicians
Members of the Belgian Federal Parliament
1961 births
People from Izegem
21st-century Belgian politicians
21st-century Belgian women politicians